Aunglan Township (Myayde Township) is a township of Thayet District in the Magway Region of Burma (Myanmar).  Its administrative seat is Aunglan. It is the southeasternmost township in Magway Region.

Borders
Aunglan Township is bordered by:
 Sinbaungwe Township to the north;
 Yedashe Township of Bago Region to the east;
 Paukkaung Township and Pyay Township of Bago Region to the south; and
 Kamma Township and Thayet Township to the west.

Transport 
Since 1999, it has been served by a branch line of Myanmar Railways.

Notes

External links
 "Aung Lan Township - Magway Division" map, Myanmar Information Management Unit (MIMU), 2008
 Township 96 on "Myanmar States/Divisions & Townships Overview Map" Myanmar Information Management Unit (MIMU)
 "Aunglan Google Satellite Map" Maplandia

Townships of Magway Region